The 2022–23 season is the 71st in the history of F.C. Arouca and their second consecutive season in the top flight. The club will participate in the Primeira Liga, the Taça de Portugal, and the Taça da Liga.

Players

First-team squad

Out on loan

Transfers

Pre-season and friendlies

Competitions

Overall record

Primeira Liga

League table

Results summary

Results by round

Matches 
The league fixtures were announced on 5 July 2022.

Taça de Portugal

Taça da Liga

Knockout phase

Statistics

Goalscorers 

Last updated: 5 February 2023

References 

F.C. Arouca seasons
Arouca